Dinozé is a commune in the Vosges department in Grand Est in northeastern France. The commune is located on the left bank of the Moselle, six miles upstream of Epinal. It is dominated by green hills and the Rainjuménil woods.

The commune of Dinozé was established in March 1932. The village had been previously part of Arches.

See also
Communes of the Vosges department

References

Communes of Vosges (department)
Vosges communes articles needing translation from French Wikipedia